Gretchen Esther Whitmer (born August 23, 1971) is an American lawyer and politician serving as the 49th governor of Michigan since 2019. A member of the Democratic Party, she served in the Michigan House of Representatives from 2001 to 2006 and in the Michigan Senate from 2006 to 2015.

Whitmer was born and raised in Michigan. She is a graduate of Forest Hills Central High School near Grand Rapids, Michigan State University, and the Michigan State University College of Law, which at the time was the Detroit College of Law.   She ran unsuccessfully for the state House of Representatives in the 1990s before being elected in 2000. In 2006, she became a state senator, a position she kept until term limits forced her to step down in 2015. She was the Senate's first female Democratic leader from 2011 to 2015. In 2013, Whitmer gained national attention for a floor speech during a debate on abortion in which she shared her experience of being sexually assaulted. For six months in 2016, she was the county prosecutor for Ingham County.

Whitmer was elected governor in the 2018 Michigan gubernatorial election, defeating the Republican Attorney General of Michigan, Bill Schuette. As governor, Whitmer has focused on healthcare and infrastructure. In February 2020, she was selected to give the Democratic response to then President Donald Trump's 2020 State of the Union Address. On October 8, 2020, the Federal Bureau of Investigation thwarted a militia group's kidnapping plot against Whitmer. Since January 2021, Whitmer has served as one of the vice chairs of the Democratic National Committee. She was reelected governor in 2022, defeating Republican nominee Tudor Dixon by an 11% margin.

Early life and education
Gretchen Whitmer was born on August 23, 1971, in Lansing, Michigan, the eldest of three children of Sharon H. "Sherry" Reisig and Richard Whitmer, both attorneys. Her father was head of the state department of commerce under Governor William Milliken and was the president and CEO of Blue Cross Blue Shield of Michigan between 1988 and 2006. Whitmer's mother worked as an assistant attorney general under Michigan Attorney General, Frank J. Kelley. Her parents divorced when she was ten years old. She and her siblings moved with their mother to Grand Rapids, and her father traveled from his home in Detroit to visit the family at least once a week.

Whitmer attended and graduated from Forest Hills Central High School near Grand Rapids, Michigan. She received a Bachelor of Arts with a major in communication and a Juris Doctor from Michigan State University in 1993 and 1998, respectively.

State legislature

House of Representatives

Whitmer originally ran for the Michigan House of Representatives in the 1990s but was unsuccessful. In 2000, she tried again and was elected to represent the 70th House district. She was reelected to the 69th House district in 2002 and 2004.

State Senate

In March 2006, Whitmer won a special election to the Michigan State Senate, replacing Virg Bernero, who had been elected mayor of Lansing in November 2005. She was elected to a full term in November, and reelected in 2010. In 2011, Whitmer's Democratic colleagues unanimously chose her to be the Senate Democratic Leader, making her the first woman to lead a party caucus in the Senate. Due to term limits, Whitmer was unable to run for reelection in 2014 and left office in 2015. In 2013, she received national recognition when she discussed her experience of being sexually assaulted. She told the story during a debate about abortion rights, particularly for victims of rape, arguing victims should be allowed to terminate pregnancies that result from rape.

Ingham County prosecutor
On May 11, 2016, it was announced that the judges of Michigan's 30th Judicial Circuit Court had unanimously selected Whitmer to serve the remaining six months of outgoing Ingham County Prosecutor Stuart Dunnings III's term, after he was arrested on March 14, 2016, and charged with 11 counts of involvement with a prostitute and four counts of willful neglect of duty. In a letter dated March 29, 2016, Dunnings announced he would resign effective July 2.

On June 21, 2016, Whitmer was administered the oath of office as prosecutor by Ingham County Circuit Court Chief Judge Janelle Lawless. She said her top priorities during her six months of service would be to determine if any other officials in the prosecutor's office knew about Dunnings's alleged crimes and to change how the office handled domestic violence and sexual assault cases.

On July 22, 2016, Whitmer issued an 11-page report on whether Dunnings's alleged criminal activity had affected cases handled by the office. The report concluded that employees "were never asked to compromise a case or look the other way" and that she had "full confidence that any problem that had existed in this office left with Mr. Dunnings". Whitmer's term expired on December 31, 2016.

Governorship

Elections

2018

On January 3, 2017, Whitmer announced she would run in the 2018 Michigan gubernatorial race. On August 7, 2018, Whitmer became the Democratic nominee for governor of Michigan. She won all 83 counties in the state in the Democratic primary.

In July 2018, Republican officials accused Whitmer of supporting the movement to abolish ICE, a claim that Whitmer disputed. She said that, if elected, she would focus on improving Michigan's fundamentals, such as schools, roads, and water systems. Whitmer's main opponent was Republican Bill Schuette, the term-limited attorney general of Michigan. The two candidates met for a debate on October 12, 2018, in Grand Rapids, at WOOD-TV. A second debate was held at WDIV studios in Detroit on October 24.

Whitmer defeated Schuette in the November 6 election by nearly a 10-point margin.

2022

Whitmer was reelected to a second term in 2022, defeating Republican nominee Tudor Dixon.

Tenure
Whitmer describes herself as a progressive Democrat, who can work with state legislators from different political perspectives.

As both a gubernatorial candidate and as governor, one of Whitmer's key pledges was to "fix the damn roads", a reference to Michigan's struggling infrastructure. Her initial post-election plan to fund road repairs with a 45-cent-per-gallon gas tax increase was deeply unpopular, with one poll finding it opposed by 75% of Michigan voters, including majorities of Democrats and independent voters. Democratic legislators in Michigan's Republican-controlled legislature largely declined to support the plan, which would have nearly tripled Michigan's gas tax and potentially made it the highest in the nation.

Whitmer's first budget earmarked several billions of dollars for investment in infrastructure. In 2019, she struggled with the Republican-controlled legislature to pass a budget and made several concessions.

The gubernatorial election and national conversation during Whitmer's time in office focused largely on healthcare. During the election, she was the only Democratic candidate not to support a single-payer healthcare system. As governor, she has focused on women's healthcare and Medicaid expansion.

In May 2020, the Edenville Dam gave way after awaiting an overdue report on its safety standards. Whitmer directed the Michigan Department of Environment, Great Lakes, and Energy (EGLE) to form an investigation that "state Republicans, flooding victim advocates and dam safety experts" criticized, concerned that the state's environmental agency would essentially be investigating itself. Guidelines from the Association of State Dam Safety Officials advocate independent investigators. An inquiry launched by the United States House of Representatives later gave the EGLE and FERC a two-week deadline for answers.

After the 2022 Michigan elections, Democrats took control of the Senate and House of Representatives, allowing Whitmer greater control of her legislative agenda. She laid out her plans in her January 26, 2023, State of The State address. She called for a repeal of the state's retirement tax, raising the state's earned income tax credit from 6% to 30%, universal pre-K, investment in renewable energy such as wind and solar power, a repeal of Michigan's now defunct 1931 abortion ban, increasing education spending, stricter regulations on firearms such as universal background checks and a ban on 3D printed guns, the addition of sexual identity and gender identity in the Elliott-Larsen Civil Rights Act, and further investment in manufacturing.

COVID-19 pandemic

Whitmer issued a stay-at-home order in response to the COVID-19 pandemic in March 2020. This order was met with broad public approval; a March poll found that 69% of Michigan residents supported Whitmer's actions, including 61% of self-identified Republicans.

After Whitmer extended the order and tightened restrictions in April, an eight-hour protest against the restrictions, organized by the Michigan Conservative Coalition and co-hosted by the Michigan Freedom Fund, attracted between 3,000 and 4,000 protesters to the Michigan State Capitol. New York Times columnist Charlie Warzel described the demonstration as "twisted, paranoid and racialized", pushed by conspiracy theorists such as Alex Jones. Jeanine Pirro of Fox News praised the protesters, saying: "God bless them, it’s going to happen all over the country." At the time of the protest, more than 1,900 people in Michigan had died after contracting the virus. On April 29, a Michigan judge upheld the order against legal challenge, ruling: "Our fellow residents have an interest to remain unharmed by a highly communicable and deadly virus. And since the state entered the Union in 1837, it has had the broad power to act for the public health of the entire state when faced with a public crisis."

Polling by the Detroit Regional Chamber in mid-April found that 57% of Michigan residents approved of Whitmer's handling of the COVID-19 pandemic, including the extension, despite the protests. The family of the first child to die of COVID-19 in Michigan expressed support for Whitmer's decision to extend the stay-at-home order on the grounds that social distancing would save lives. LaVondria Herbert, the child's mother, said: "I want to say thank you to the governor for making people go home."

In May 2020, Detroit-based rapper Gmac Cash released a song, "Big Gretch", in support of Whitmer and her handling of the pandemic. In the song, Cash calls to put "Buffs on her face", referring to a brand of buffalo horn sunglasses from Cartier, which Detroiters consider a sign of respect.

On October 2, 2020, the Michigan Supreme Court ruled 4–3 that "a state law allowing the governor to declare emergencies and keep them in place without legislative input—the 1945 Emergency Powers of the Governor Act—is unconstitutional", and unanimously ruled that the 1976 Emergency Management Act "did not give Whitmer the power, after April 30, to issue or renew any executive orders related to the COVID-19 pandemic after 28 days without Legislative approval". Also on October 2, a petition containing 539,384 signatures was submitted seeking to repeal the 1945 EPGA law allowing Whitmer emergency powers during the pandemic.

In March 2021, Whitmer traveled to Florida for three days to visit her ailing father. The trip was controversial, in part because Whitmer did not self-quarantine on her return, despite voluntary guidelines from the Michigan Department of Health and Human Services recommending self-quarantine for a full seven days after travel; Whitmer's staff said she was regularly tested for COVID-19. Further controversy about the trip arose because of Air Eagle LLC, the company hired to fly Whitmer to Florida, is not authorized to operate charter flights.

In May 2021, Whitmer was photographed with a large group of unmasked people, with no social distancing, in a bar in East Lansing. The restaurant was violating state-mandated social distancing guidelines that restricted indoor dining to no more than six people on a table. Whitmer apologized for the incident.

National profile
In February 2020, Whitmer was selected to deliver the Democratic response to the State of the Union address by then President Donald Trump. Michigan was considered a swing state in the 2020 United States presidential election, and it was speculated that Democrats hoped selecting Whitmer would bolster their chance of winning the state.

In early March, days before the 2020 Michigan Democratic presidential primary, Whitmer endorsed Joe Biden, and joined his campaign as a national co-chair.

In 2020, amid her handling of the COVID-19 pandemic, as well as after tweets in which Trump attacked her and called her "that woman from Michigan", Whitmer gained a greater national profile. Her response to the pandemic was the subject of the cover story of Newsweek May 1, 2020, edition. Also in May, Cecily Strong impersonated Whitmer on an episode of Saturday Night Live. Strong portrayed Whitmer on the show again in February 2021.

Biden and his team vetted Whitmer as a potential running mate during their 2020 Democratic Party vice presidential candidate selection, with Biden confirming she was on his shortlist in March. Michigan's status as a key swing state was seen as boosting her prospects of being selected. The New York Times reported that she was one of four finalists for the position, along with Kamala Harris, Susan Rice, and Elizabeth Warren; Harris was ultimately selected. By some reporting, Whitmer removed herself from consideration, urging Biden to choose a Black woman instead. While Whitmer was not selected, her consideration for the position further elevated her national stature.

Whitmer delivered a speech at the 2020 Democratic National Convention that praised Biden's work in rescuing the Michigan auto industry and criticized Trump's handling of the COVID-19 pandemic. Whitmer was seen as having strong prospects of being offered a position in Biden's cabinet. On January 9, 2021, she said she was not interested in leaving her role as governor.

In early January 2021, then-President-elect Biden nominated Whitmer as one of the vice chair candidates for the Democratic National Committee; the committee elected Whitmer and the rest of the slate of candidates on January 20 unopposed.

Kidnapping plot

On October 8, 2020, a federal indictment against six men associated with the Wolverine Watchmen, a Michigan-based militia group, was unsealed. The indictment charges the men with plotting to kidnap Whitmer and violently overthrow Michigan's government. The FBI became aware of the scheme in early 2020 after communications among the far-right group were discovered, and via an undercover agent who met with more than a dozen individuals at a meeting in Dublin, Ohio. Another seven men were charged with state crimes in relation to the plot. Facebook is cooperating with the investigation, since the federal criminal complaint detailed how the group used a private Facebook group to discuss the alleged plot.

In the wake of the unsealed indictment, Whitmer, in a livestream, thanked the law enforcement agencies involved in the investigation, called the plotters "sick and depraved men", and blamed Trump for refusing to explicitly condemn far-right groups and for his handling of the COVID-19 pandemic in the United States. In April 2022, two men (Harris and Caserta) were acquitted on all charges on grounds of entrapment by federal authorities. In August 2022, two others (Fox and Barry Croft Jr.) were convicted of conspiracy to kidnap. In October 2022, three others (Morrison, Musico, and Bellar) were convicted of providing material support for a terrorist act. Additionally, Garbin and Franks pleaded guilty.

Political positions

Abortion

During the COVID-19 pandemic, groups within the United States anti-abortion movement criticized Whitmer for allowing abortion procedures to continue in Michigan, stating that they were "life-sustaining". In September 2021, Whitmer began working with the state legislature to repeal a 90-year-old law that banned abortion in Michigan, so as to preserve abortion rights in the state in case Roe v. Wade was overturned.

Cannabis legalization

In 2018, as a candidate for governor, Whitmer spoke at Hash Bash to endorse Proposal 1 to legalize recreational cannabis in Michigan. Whitmer said that she had been a longtime supporter of legalizing cannabis, "before it was politically fashionable", and that the time was right to "get it done" so "maybe we can get to work filling those damn potholes" and "regulate it so it doesn't get in the hands of kids". In 2019, as governor, she reappeared at Hash Bash via recorded video message, saying: "We worked hard, we got it done, we made recreational marijuana legal in the state of Michigan."

COVID-19 policy
In 2020, Whitmer vetoed a bill that would have shifted elderly people with COVID-19 out of nursing homes and into entirely separate facilities.

Education
Whitmer has said she would like to phase in full-day universal pre-k for 4-year-olds in Michigan. She would eliminate Michigan's current 3rd grade "read-or-flunk" policy, which she has said penalizes students the education system has failed, and would instead work to improve their reading skills. She proposes that all high school students be offered two years of debt-free higher education, either college or post-secondary training for skilled trades.

Environment 
Whitmer has ordered the closure of major oil pipelines in Michigan and supports renewable energy initiatives. She has been endorsed by the Sierra Club's Michigan Chapter. Whitmer is a proponent of expanding industry onto agricultural lands and natural areas throughout Michigan, most notably in supporting industrial "Megasites", such as the proposed Marshall Megasite or Michigan Megasite, which would use 1,600 acres of agricultural lands and natural area along the Kalamazoo River for industrial development. Environmentalists at The National Wildlife Federation oppose this, saying that the protection of natural areas is critical for wildlife habitat and in fighting the effects of climate change by offsetting carbon emissions. In February 2019, Whitmer issued an executive order No. 2019-06, which calls for the reorganization of government departments and renamed The Department of Environmental Quality the Department of Environment, Great Lakes, and Energy. The department that promotes the development of industrial Megasites is thus now under the umbrella of the former Department of Environmental Quality.

Guns

On January 11, 2021, Whitmer called for a ban on all weapons inside the Michigan State Capitol in response to armed protestors in April 2020. In her seven "concrete steps" to deter school shooting, she has called for bans on bump stocks and increasing resources for school resource officers. In 2019, Whitmer joined 11 other governors in calling for stricter gun control laws in the form of  "common sense gun legislation". In 2012, she wrote an open letter to National Rifle Association President Wayne LaPierre on HuffPost about actions to prevent further school violence like the Sandy Hook Elementary School shooting.

Health care
Whitmer has said she would fight Republican efforts to take away protections for patients with preexisting conditions. In the State Senate, she successfully worked to expand Medicaid coverage in the state under the Affordable Care Act. She spoke against single-payer healthcare as unrealistic on a state level in 2018. She also said she would work to lower the cost of prescription drugs and would get rid of Schuette's drug immunity law, which she believes protects drug companies from legal trouble if their drugs harm or kill people.

Immigration
Whitmer disapproved of Trump's plan to exclude illegal immigrants from the 2020 United States Census. In 2019, she told immigration rights groups that she supported plans to give undocumented immigrants driver's licenses or a form of government ID.

LGBT rights 
On June 7, 2018, Whitmer advocated for expanding the protections of the Elliott-Larsen Civil Rights Act. She has issued executive orders to prevent discrimination against members of the LGBT community. In 2022, Whitmer was endorsed by the Human Rights Campaign.

Taxation
In March 2019, Whitmer proposed increasing the gasoline tax by 45 cents per gallon to fund road repairs; it was not enacted. In 2021, she proposed a new 6% income tax on businesses that organize as partnerships, limited liability companies, and S corporations.

Voting rights 
On March 28, 2020, Whitmer signed an executive order expanding access to mail-in voting.

Personal life
Whitmer has two children with her first husband, Gary Shrewsbury. The couple divorced, and in 2011 she married dentist Marc P. Mallory, who has three children from his previous marriage. Whitmer and Mallory live in the Michigan Governor's Mansion in Lansing, Michigan, with her two daughters and his three sons. They also own a vacation cottage in Antrim County, near Elk Rapids. In May 2021, Whitmer was sharply criticized after being photographed without a mask at a Michigan restaurant, a violation of the state's COVID-19 mandate. She soon publicly apologized.

See also 
 Electoral history of Gretchen Whitmer
 List of female governors in the United States

References

External links

 Governor Gretchen Whitmer official government website
 Gretchen Whitmer for Governor campaign website
 
 

|-

|-

|-

|-

|-

|-

|-

|-

|-

1971 births
Living people
20th-century American politicians
20th-century American women politicians
21st-century American politicians
21st-century American women politicians
Democratic Party governors of Michigan
 
Democratic Party members of the Michigan House of Representatives
Democratic Party Michigan state senators
Michigan State University College of Law alumni
Politicians from Lansing, Michigan
Women state constitutional officers of Michigan
Women state governors of the United States
Women state legislators in Michigan